Neophasia is a genus of pierid butterflies found in North America.

Species
Neophasia menapia (Felder, C & R Felder, 1859)
Neophasia terlooii Behr, 1869

References

 
Taxa named by Hans Hermann Behr
Pierini
Pieridae genera